Alassane Diop (born 22 September 1997) is a Mauritanian footballer who plays as a midfielder for Zakho and the Mauritania national team.

Club career
On 31 December 2019 Diop confirmed on his official Instagram account, that he had joined Omani club Al-Orouba SC.

International career
Diop was included in Mauritania's squad for the 2018 African Nations Championship squads in Morocco. He made his debut for Mauritania on 13 January 2018 against Morocco.

Career statistics

International
Statistics accurate as of match played 16 October 2018

Honours 
Latvian Football Cup: winner (2017)

References

External links
 
 

1997 births
Living people
Mauritanian footballers
Mauritania international footballers
Association football midfielders
Mauritanian expatriate footballers
FC Nouadhibou players
FK Liepāja players
Hajer FC players
Al-Shamal SC players
Zakho FC players
Latvian Higher League players
Saudi First Division League players
2018 African Nations Championship players
2019 Africa Cup of Nations players
Mauritanian expatriate sportspeople in Saudi Arabia
Mauritanian expatriate sportspeople in Latvia
Expatriate footballers in Saudi Arabia
Expatriate footballers in Qatar
Expatriate footballers in Iraq
Expatriate footballers in Latvia
Expatriate footballers in Oman
Mauritanian expatriate sportspeople in Iraq
Mauritanian expatriate sportspeople in Qatar
Mauritanian expatriate sportspeople in Oman
Mauritania A' international footballers